Borden County Independent School District is a public school district based in the community of Gail, Texas, United States. The district serves all of Borden County with the exception of a small southwestern portion, which is served by the Sands Consolidated Independent School District. A small portion of Howard County lies within the district.

Finances
As of the 2010-2011 school year, the appraised valuation of property in the district was $849,037,000. The maintenance tax rate was $0.104 and the bond tax rate was $0.028 per $100 of appraised valuation.

Academic achievement
In 2011, the school district was rated "exemplary" by the Texas Education Agency.  Five percent of districts in Texas in 2011 received the same rating. No state accountability ratings will be given to districts in 2012. A school district in Texas can receive one of four possible rankings from the Texas Education Agency: Exemplary (the highest possible ranking), Recognized, Academically Acceptable, and Academically Unacceptable (the lowest possible ranking).

Historical district TEA accountability ratings
2011: Exemplary
2010: Exemplary
2009: Exemplary
2008: Recognized
2007: Recognized
2006: Recognized
2005: Academically Acceptable
2004: Recognized

Schools
In the 2011-2012 school year, the district had students in two schools.
Regular instructional
Borden County School (Grades Pre-K-12)
Alternative instructional
Lamesa DAEP (Grades 9-12)

Special programs

UIL Academics
2018 - Texas 1A Academic Meet State Champion
2019 - Texas 1A Academic Meet State Champion

Athletics
Borden County High School participates in the boys sports of baseball, basketball, football, and wrestling. The school participates in the girls sports of basketball and softball. Borden High School plays six-man football. For the 2012 through 2014 school years, Borden County High School will play football in UIL Class 1A 6-man Football Division I.
State football championships
1997 - Texas 1A 6-man state champions
1998 - Texas 1A 6-man state runners-up
2008 - Texas 1A Division II 6-man state champions
2009 - Texas 1A Division II 6-man state champions
2011 - Texas 1A Division I 6-man state runners-up
2016 - Texas 1A Division I 6-man state champions
2017 - Texas 1A Division I 6-man state champions

See also

List of school districts in Texas
List of high schools in Texas
Farm to Market Road 669
Llano Estacado
West Texas

References

External links
Borden County ISD

School districts in Borden County, Texas
School districts in Howard County, Texas